Straight No Chaser is the second overall album by British pop musician Mr Hudson and his first as a solo artist. It is the follow-up to the last album released with his band Mr Hudson and the Library entitled A Tale of Two Cities. Straight No Chaser was released in the UK on 19 October 2009. It was released in the United States on 29 June 2010.

Background
Sessions first started at Gizzard Studios in Bow, East London, with the album being engineered by Ed Deegan, however the Library (Mr Hudson's backing band) were soon fired and tapes were shelved when Mr Hudson was then flown to the Bahamas to record a new album with Kanye West. In an interview, singer Ben Hudson was asked to describe the album: "My mission statement was to make a pop record, but not a throwaway pop record. My heroes are people like Bowie and Prince and Damon Albarn. I didn't want to do anything niche. Kanye threw down the gauntlet. He said, 'Let's see if we can make you a popstar'. I was like 'Let's have a go!'. It's a bit more widescreen, a bit more punchy, but the eclecticism of the first record's still there. There's a tune where I'm a cross between Deliverance and Sade".

Track listing

Personnel

Artists
 Mr Hudson – primary artist (all tracks)
 Kanye West – featured artist (tracks 1,10)
 Joy Joseph – background artist (tracks 1–3, 5, 9, 12, 13)
 Sara Skeete – background artist (track 2)
Technical personnel
 Andrew Dawson – mixing (track 1)
 Manny Marroquin – mixing (tracks 1, 3, 4, 10, 13)
 Andy Savours – mixing (tracks 2, 5, 6, 8, 11, 12), recording (track 5)
 Anthony Kilhoffer – mixing (track 7)
 Catherine Marks – recording (tracks 1, 10, 11, 13)

Record producers
 Dave McCracken – production (tracks 1, 2)
 Mr Hudson – production (tracks 3, 5–10, 12, 13), additional production (tracks 4, 11)
 The Bullitts – production (tracks 4, 11)
 Andy Savours – production (track 5)
 Steve Robson – production (track 8)
 Kanye West – additional production (track 1)
 Wilkie Wilkinson – percussion (tracks 1, 2)
 Torville Jones – piano (tracks 2, 6, 12, 13), synthesizer (track 3)
 Rory Moore, Jr. – organ (track 3)
 Craig Owen – strings (track 5)
 Raphael Mann – synth, acoustic guitar (track 5)
Additional personnel
 Kanye West – executive producer
 DJ Semtex – A&R
 Traffic – design
 Jon Mac – management
 Tony Tagoe – management
 Marc Jordan – management (U.S.)
 Rebel One – management (U.S.)
 Rankin – photography (front cover)
 Colin Whitehouse – photography (inlay)
 Nabil Elderkin – photography (inside booklet
 Rachael Paley – product manager

Singles
"There Will Be Tears" was the first single from Straight No Chaser, but failed to attract the attention of the media, something only "Supernova" achieved in chart success.
"Supernova" was the second single from Straight No Chaser. The single features American artist Kanye West, usually a rapper, as a singer on this track. It debuted at number 2 on the UK Singles Chart, behind the number one single "Beat Again" by JLS.
"White Lies" was the third single from Straight No Chaser. The song was released on 12 October 2009 in the United Kingdom and reached #20 on the UK Singles Chart.
"Anyone But Him" was the fourth single from Straight No Chaser.

Chart performance 
Straight No Chaser debuted at #25 in the United Kingdom on 25 October 2009.

References

2009 albums
Albums produced by Kanye West
GOOD Music albums
Mr Hudson albums
Albums produced by Mr Hudson
Albums produced by The Bullitts